Yerson Opazo (born 24 December 1984) is a Chilean footballer that currently plays for the Chilean Primera División club Curicó Unido as right midfielder. He has previously played for Universidad de Chile, Deportes La Serena, Colo-Colo , O'Higgins, Huachipato and San Luis de Quillota.

Club career

Universidad de Chile
Opazo began his career at Chilean club, Universidad de Chile. After of play many years in the youth teams of this club, he was promoted to the first team in January 2005 and then was loaned to Deportes La Serena in June of that year. With the 'papayas', he was a key player in the starting XI, so that did reach the semi-finals against Universidad Católica, thanks to the good performance of the team.

For the next season, Opazo returned to Universidad de Chile, but he was on many occasions at the bench, because the experimentates players Waldo Ponce and Julio Moreyra played in his position as frequency players in the team's lineup. In the 2006 Clausura, second semestral tournament, Opazo scored his first competitive goal in his career, in a 2–0 win over Santiago Wanderers on 22 October, scoring the first goal of the game at 14th minute. In 2007, he had an opaque moment in his career and his life, he only played 3 games for the Apertura tournament and protagonizated a scandal with his team-mate Mauricio Pinilla at a disco, being fired the next day Pinilla and Opazo by the coach Jorge Socías.

Deportes La Serena
After one semester without football activity, Opazo was signed by Deportes La Serena, club in where completed a good season in the Clausura 2005 tournament. On 26 January 2008, he made his club debut for a league game against Audax Italiano in a 0–0 away draw at Estadio Monumental. He completed a good season at Serena, playing all games of his club and contributing much at the scheme of the coach Víctor Hugo Castañeda. Because his performance, this made that Yerson would have a chance of be transferred to Colo-Colo, rival of his former club Universidad de Chile.

Colo-Colo
On 31 December 2008, it was confirmed that Opazo joined Colo-Colo for play the national tournament and the 2009 Copa Libertadores. However, he suffered an injury that made miss to the player the first games of the season, Yerson including only played 7 games in his stady, being after fired by the coach Hugo Tocalli.

O'Higgins

In 2012, Opazo was runner-up with O'Higgins, after lose the final against Universidad de Chile in the penalty shoot-out, and he was selected as the best right back of the tournament and the year.

In 2013, he won the Apertura 2013-14 with O'Higgins. In the tournament, he played in 16 of 18 matches. In 2014, he won the Supercopa de Chile against Deportes Iquique.

He participated with the club in the 2014 Copa Libertadores where they faced Deportivo Cali, Cerro Porteño and Lanús, being third and being eliminated in the group stage. In the tournament, Opazo scored two goals, both against Deportivo Cali.

Career statistics

Club

Honours

Club
O'Higgins
Primera División: 2013 Apertura
Supercopa de Chile: 2014

Individual

O'Higgins
Medalla Santa Cruz de Triana: 2014

References

External links
 

1984 births
Living people
People from Villarrica
Chilean footballers
Deportes La Serena footballers
O'Higgins F.C. footballers
Universidad de Chile footballers
Colo-Colo footballers
C.D. Huachipato footballers
San Luis de Quillota footballers
Curicó Unido footballers
Association football defenders